Skin is the lead singer of Skunk Anansie and a solo artist. She has released two albums as a solo artist and featured on several other artists albums. For Skunk Anansie's full discography see Skunk Anansie discography.

This discography features Skin's main releases across Europe.

Studio albums

Singles

Appearances

As a solo artist, Skin has worked with various other artists and provided her work for sound tracks.

Notes

References

Discographies of British artists
Pop music discographies